Sporadanthus is a group of plants in the Restionaceae first described as a genus in 1874 by Ferdinand von Mueller. It is native to Australia and New Zealand.

 Species

References

Restionaceae
Poales genera
Taxa named by Ferdinand von Mueller
Plants described in 1874